The politics of Brittany, France takes place in a framework of a presidential representative democracy, whereby the President of Regional Council is the head of government, and of a pluriform multi-party system. Legislative power is vested in the regional council.

Executive
The executive of the region is led by the President of the regional council.

List of presidents

Legislative branch

The Regional Council of Brittany (Conseil régional de Bretagne, Kuzul Rannvroel Breizh) is composed of 83 councillors, elected by proportional representation in a two-round system. The winning list in the second round is automatically entitled to a quarter of the seats. The remainder of the seats are allocated through proportional representation with a 5% threshold.

The Council is elected for a six-year term.

Current composition

Elections

Other elections

In the 2007 legislative election, 13 Socialists were elected. The UMP won 11 seats. One centrist affiliated with the MoDem (now New Centre) was elected. One PS dissident, Marcel Rogemont was also elected.

References

External links
Bretagne Region